Neznamovo is a rural locality (a selo) and the administrative center of Neznamovskoye Rural Settlement, Starooskolsky District, Belgorod Oblast, Russia. The population was 1,430 as of 2010. There are 9 streets.

Geography 
Neznamovo is located 11 km southeast of Stary Oskol (the district's administrative centre) by road. Anpilovka is the nearest rural locality.

References 

Rural localities in Starooskolsky District